Hanns Ernst Jäger (1 January 1910 – 15 August 1973) was a German actor. He appeared in more than 50 films and television shows between 1958 and 1972.

Filmography

References

External links

1910 births
1973 deaths
German male film actors